Kaleidoscope Human Rights Foundation (commonly known as "Kaleidoscope Human Rights Foundation" or KHRF) is a non-governmental organisation based in Australia that works to protect the rights of LGBTIQ+ people in the Asia Pacific region.

Objectives
The stated objective of the organisation is "to promote human rights (as set out in the Universal Declaration of Human Rights and subsequent United Nations conventions and declarations) and particularly the rights and freedoms of those who face discrimination on the grounds of sexual orientation, gender identity or intersex status".

History
Kaleidoscope Human Rights Foundation was founded in September 2013 and was inspired by The Kaleidoscope Trust in the UK.  professor Paula Gerber, the deputy director of the Castan Centre for Human Rights Law at Monash University, was the inaugural president, and continues to be a director of the organisation. Michael Kirby is the patron.

Advocacy
Kaleidoscope Human Rights Foundation has a particular focus on submitting shadow reports to UN treaty committees and also to the UN Human Rights Council. The intention is to ensure that every national review by UN committees and the Council includes an examination of the human rights of sexual and gender minorities as well as wider human rights issues. To date, shadow reports have been prepared for the Human Rights Committee on Nepal, Cambodia, Japan, and Sri Lanka. The Melbourne offices of the law firm DLA Piper helped in the writing of these reports. 

In addition shadow reports on the Marshall Islands, Nauru, Nepal, Myanmar  and Micronesia have all been submitted to the Human Rights Council for these countries' Universal Periodic Reviews.  

It is still too early to examine how effective the submission of these reports has been as the review process is still ongoing for most of these countries and it often takes several years before reform processes role out in countries who have been assessed. However, there are promising indications that one of the first Shadow Reports on Sri Lanka may have spurred the government there to move its position.

Kaleidoscope also keeps up lines of communication with the Australian government over issues relating to Australia's foreign relations with regional nations over their record on the human rights of sexual or gender minorities. During the election campaign in 2013, KAHRF ran a pledge campaign to get the political parties in Australia committed to LGBTI rights in foreign policy. They were successful in getting the Greens, Labor and the Liberal candidate in Melbourne Ports, Kevin Ekendahl, to sign the pledge. In November 2013, Kaleidoscope Australia was also one of almost 20 groups across the Commonwealth that participated in and helped publish the "Speaking Out" report on Homophobia in the Commonwealth that had been coordinated and compiled by the Kaleidoscope Trust.

References

External links  
The Kaleidoscope Australia website

LGBT political advocacy groups in Australia
2013 establishments in Australia
Organizations established in 2013